Artocarpus rigidus is a tree species in the Moraceae that was described by Blume.  A. rigidus is a wild species of the breadfruit/jackfruit genus (Artocarpus) and may be referred to as monkey jack. Its Vietnamese name is mít nài (sometimes da xóp).

This 20–25 m trees species can be found in Indochina and Malesia.  The subspecies A. rigidus subsp. asperulus (Gagnep.) F.M.Jarrett is accepted; synonyms for the latter are: Artocarpus asperulus Gagnep. and A. calophyllus Kurz.

References

External links 

rigidus
Flora of Vietnam